Aechmea pyramidalis is a plant species in the genus Aechmea. This species is native to Ecuador, Colombia and Peru.

References

pyramidalis
Flora of South America
Plants described in 1846